Ferrus or Ferrús is a surname. Notable people with the name include:

 Diana Ferrus (born 1953), South African writer, poet and storyteller
 Guillaume Ferrus (1784–1861), French psychiatrist
 José Benetó Ferrús (1919–2006), Valencian politician
 Pero Ferrús, 14th-century Castilian poet